Mariángeles Caraballo Gil (born 5 June 1997) is a Uruguayan footballer who plays as a goalkeeper for CA Cerro. She has been a member of the Uruguay women's national team.

Club career
Caraballo played in Uruguay for Nacional, River Plate and Cerro.

International career
Caraballo played for Uruguay at senior level in the 2014 Copa América Femenina.

References 

1997 births
Living people
Women's association football goalkeepers
Uruguayan women's footballers
Uruguay women's international footballers
Club Nacional de Football players
Club Atlético River Plate (Montevideo) players
C.A. Cerro players